Erlauf is a river of Lower Austria and of Styria, Austria.

The Erlauf springs at the foot of the mountain  It is a right tributary of the Danube in Pöchlarn.

References

Rivers of Lower Austria
Rivers of Styria
Rivers of Austria